The Best of Kiss, Volume 2: The Millennium Collection is the first and so far only Kiss single album compilation to cover their material from the 1980s, as well as the second album in a trilogy of Millennium Collection albums featuring material from Kiss. It compiles the period from late 1982–89, skipping material from 1980's Unmasked and 1981's Music From "The Elder".

This disc, along with Volumes 1 and 3 of the Millennium Collection, was repackaged and released as a collection known as "Playlist...Plus" in 2008.

Track listing

Personnel
Members
Paul Stanley – Vocals, Rhythm Guitar, Acoustic Guitar (Track 12), Bass (Track 7)
Gene Simmons – Vocals, Bass
Eric Carr – Drums, Backing Vocals
Bruce Kulick – Lead Guitar and Backing Vocals (Tracks 7-12), Bass and Acoustic Guitar Solo (Track 12)
Vinnie Vincent – Lead Guitar and Backing Vocals (Tracks 2-4)
Mark St. John – Lead Guitar (Track 5-6)

Additional personnel
Jean Beauvoir – Bass and Backing Vocals (Tracks 6 & 8)
Steve Farris – Guitar Solo (Track 1)
Adam Mitchell – Additional Guitar (Track 1)
Mike Porcaro – Bass (Track 1) 
Phil Ashley – Keyboards (Tracks 10-12), Backing Vocals (Track 11)
Dave Wittman – Backing Vocals (Track 2)
Desmond Child - Backing Vocals (Track 5)

References

Kiss
Kiss (band) compilation albums
2004 greatest hits albums